VesselSat-1 (Orbcomm FM42, V1) was a miniaturized satellite built and owned by LuxSpace, which was operated by Orbcomm under lease. VesselSat-1 and its sister satellite, VesselSat-2 were used by Orbcomm to compensate the functionality of the malfunctioning Orbcomm-QL satellites.

Launch
It was launched from the ISRO's Satish Dhawan Space Centre (SDSC) at Sriharikota in October 2011 atop a PSLV-CA rocket, flight C18. The launch was a multi-payload mission along with Megha-Tropiques, SRMSAT and Jugnu.

Spacecraft
Vesselsat was the first satellite to be built in Luxembourg. Its mission was the tracking of shipping by receiving broadcasts from their Automatic Identification System (AIS).

See also

 2011 in spaceflight

References

External links
 Space.skyrocket.de
 Isro.org
 Luxspace.lu
 Menafn.com

Spacecraft launched in 2011